The Gölcük Plateau is in  Yalihuyuk citytown of Konya, Turkey

External links 
 http://www.kultur.gov.tr/EN/

Plateaus of Turkey